José Diego Balleza Isaias (born 27 November 1994) is a Mexican diver.

He participated at the 2019 World Aquatics Championships, winning a medal.

In 2021, he competed in the men's synchronized 10 metre platform event at the 2020 Summer Olympics held in Tokyo, Japan.

References

1994 births
Living people
Mexican male divers
World Aquatics Championships medalists in diving
Universiade medalists in diving
Universiade gold medalists for Mexico
Medalists at the 2019 Summer Universiade
Sportspeople from Jalisco
Olympic divers of Mexico
Divers at the 2020 Summer Olympics
21st-century Mexican people
20th-century Mexican people